Main Street on the March! is a 1941 American short historical film directed by Edward Cahn. It won an Academy Award at the 14th Academy Awards for Best Short Subject (Two-Reel). The 20-minute film gives a brief history of events in Europe and the U.S. in the year and a half leading up to the attack on Pearl Harbor.

Plot summary

Cast
 John Nesbitt - Narrator (voice)
 Raymond Gram Swing - Himself (voice) (archive sound)
 Neville Chamberlain - Himself (voice) (archive sound)
 H. V. Kaltenborn - Himself (voice) (archive sound)
 Franklin Delano Roosevelt - Himself (archive footage)
 Winston Churchill - Himself (voice) (archive footage)
 George C. Marshall - Himself (archive footage)
 William S. Knudsen - Himself (archive footage)
 Admiral Harold R. Stark - Himself (archive footage)

Robert Blake, then 8 years old, makes an appearance in a kitchen scene.

References

External links
 
 
 

1940s historical films
1941 short films
1941 films
American historical films
American black-and-white films
Films directed by Edward L. Cahn
Live Action Short Film Academy Award winners
Metro-Goldwyn-Mayer short films
American World War II films
Films set in the 1940s
1940s English-language films
1940s American films